Konstantin Vorobyov (born 30 October 1930) is a Soviet former marathon runner. He was born in Kirov Oblast. In 1960 he became Soviet champion and finished fourth at the 1960 Summer Olympics with his personal best of 2:19:10 h.

External links 

 Profile at the ARRS
 Profile at trackfield.brinkster.net
 Profile at Sports-Reference.com
  

1930 births
Possibly living people
Soviet male marathon runners
Athletes (track and field) at the 1960 Summer Olympics
Olympic athletes of the Soviet Union